Maybank Tower is a skyscraper in Pudu, Kuala Lumpur, Malaysia. The tower is the headquarters of Maybank and houses the Maybank Numismatic Museum.

History 
The construction of Maybank Tower commenced in 1984 on Court Hill, over the site of a colonial era Sessions Court building, and was completed in 1987. The tower remains a prominent part of the city's skyline.

Architecture

The floor plan of the tower consists of two square-based blocks that interlock each other at one of their corners. Each of the two block features a roof and lower base that slant at a direction opposite its other block, while the midsection stands in a perpendicular angle. The main access points of the tower are at the two corners of the structure that feature a space formed from the combination of the structure's two blocks, covered by tiered triangular roofs.

Transportation
The tower is accessible within walking distance north of  Plaza Rakyat Station or southwest of  Masjid Jamek Station of Rapid Rail. A major bus hub is located across Jalan Tun Perak from the tower.

See also
List of tallest buildings in Kuala Lumpur

References

Further reading

Office buildings completed in 1987
1987 establishments in Malaysia
Skyscraper office buildings in Kuala Lumpur
Maybank